Ljubina may refer to:

Ljubina, Ilijaš, settlement in Bosnia and Herzegovina
Ljubina, Foča, village in Bosnia and Herzegovina
Ljubina – Poturovići, village in Bosnia and Herzegovina
Ljubina, Dvor, village in Croatia.
Čika Ljubina, street in Belgrade
Ljubina (Bosna), right tributary of Bosna river, Bosnia and Herzegovina
Ljubina (Jablanica), right tributary of Jablanica river, in Serbia